Kamoharaia megastoma, the Wide-mouthed flounder, is a deepwater species of lefteye flounder native to the western Pacific Ocean. This species grows to a length of  TL. This species is the only known member of its genus.

References
 

Bothidae
Fish described in 1936